As If by Ghosts is an album by shoegazing band Dreamend.

Track listing
 "Of Ravens and Winds" – 5:26
 "Ellipsis" – 3:06
 "Four Days in May" – 3:56
 "The Almighty" – 4:46
 "Murmur" – 4:51
 "Can't Take You" – 4:03
 "Slide Song" – 3:41
 "The Old House and Its Occupants" – 5:14
 "10 Guitars From Salem" – 3:50
 "Passing" – 6:23

2004 albums
Dreamend albums
Graveface Records albums